This is a chronological list of films produced in Norway ordered by decade of release on separate pages:

List of Norwegian films before 1930
List of Norwegian films of the 1930s
List of Norwegian films of the 1940s
List of Norwegian films of the 1950s
List of Norwegian films of the 1960s
List of Norwegian films of the 1970s
List of Norwegian films of the 1980s
List of Norwegian films of the 1990s
List of Norwegian films of the 2000s
List of Norwegian films of the 2010s
List of Norwegian films of the 2020s

See also
List of years in Norway
List of years in Norwegian television

External links
 Norwegian film at the Internet Movie Database
  GROUND CONTROL AS, A Norwegian Production Service Company]
 dinfilmside.no Norwegian film database (in Norwegian)